English New Zealanders are New Zealanders of English descent, or English-born people currently living in New Zealand. After British explorer James Cook arrived in New Zealand in 1769, many non-Polynesians began to visit and settle New Zealand, in particular, whalers, sealers, and ex-convicts from Australia, often of British (including English) ancestry. After New Zealand became a colony of Britain in 1840, the country began to receive thousands of immigrants, with over 90% of them being from Britain and Ireland, with about half of them coming from England.

Early settlement
A 19th-century English company the "New Zealand Company" played a key role in the colonisation of New Zealand. The company was formed to carry out the principles of systematic colonisation devised by Edward Gibbon Wakefield, who envisaged the creation of a new-model English society in the southern hemisphere.

Of New Zealand's English immigrants, most of them predominately originated from the south-west counties of Cornwall and Devon, with significant numbers also coming from England's southeast of London and Kent.

Due to British colonisation, and the large numbers of English immigrants from the 19th century, English culture and language has had a profound impact on New Zealand society. For instance, English is by far the predominant and most widely spoken language in the country, with approximately 4.4 million speakers (c. 95% of the population) as of the 2018 census. Also, based on the same census, England has remained as the most common place where immigrants to New Zealand come from.

Legacy
As of the early 21st century, it is estimated that at least 80% of New Zealanders have some British ancestry, which especially includes English given that at least half of immigrants that came from the United Kingdom were English. Over 50 per cent of New Zealand’s founding ethnic group were born in England as seen per the 1851 New Zealand census.
What this demonstrates is that out of a population of 5 million, around 2 million people in New Zealand are of English ancestry, likely making the English diaspora one of, if not the largest ethnic group in the country.

Birthplace

Population 
As of the 2018 New Zealand census, about 260,000 (8.3%) Europeans in the country stated that they were born in the United Kingdom, making the UK the most common place of origin for immigrants to New Zealand. England in particular, has always been a significant source of immigration. This was very much the case in the 19th century, where emigration from England ranged from 64.7% in the 1840s, to 49.7% by the 1871 census.

English culture in New Zealand 
Some of the most popular sports in New Zealand such as cricket, netball, rugby union and league, are of English origin.

References

Further reading
 Richards, Eric. Britannia's children: emigration from England, Scotland, Wales and Ireland since 1600 (A&C Black, 2004) online.

 
New Zealand people of English descent